This is a list of diplomatic missions in Mali.  At present, the capital city of Bamako hosts 38 embassies. Several other countries have ambassadors accredited to Mali, with most being resident in Dakar. 

Honorary consulates are omitted from this listing.

Diplomatic missions in Bamako

Embassies

Other missions or delegations 
 (Delegation)
 (Consulate-General)

Consulate General in Ségou

Non-resident embassies

 (Abuja)
 (Accra)
 (Dakar)
 (Rabat)
 (Algiers)
 (Algiers)
 (Cairo)
 (Algiers)
 (Abidjan)
 (Rabat)
 (Paris)
 (Algiers)
 (Dakar)
 (Rabat)
 (Cairo)
 (Rabat)
 (Conakry)
 (Dakar)
 (Paris)
 (Dakar)
 (Algiers)
 (Algiers)
 (Dakar)
 (Algiers)
 (Riyadh)
 (Dakar)
 (Valletta)
 (London)
 (Cairo)
 (Dakar)
 (Rabat)
 (Dakar)
 (Cairo)
 (Cairo)
 (Algiers)
 (Dakar)
 (Algiers)
 (Rabat)
 (Dakar)
 (Paris)
 (Dakar)
 (Dakar)
 (Conakry)
 (Algiers)
 (Abuja)
 (Dakar)
 (Algiers)
 (Abuja)
 (Algiers)
 (Dakar)
 (Ougadougou)
 (Paris)
 (Abuja)
 (Dakar)
 (Algiers)
 (Algiers)
 (Accra)
 (Accra)

References
Bamako Diplomatic List (in French)

 
Mali
Diplomatic missions